Snapshot is an album by Daryl Braithwaite released in 2005. It was his first studio album since Taste the Salt in 1993.

Track listing
"Where the Poor Boys Dance" (D. Tyson, W. Lawrie, C. Kennedy)
"This Love" (Scott Kingman, Daryl Braithwaite)
"On Love's Ocean" (Andrew Gibbs)
"See You Around Sometime" (Mark Seymour, Daryl Braithwaite)
"Duende" (Daryl Braithwaite, Andrew Gibbs)
"Start All Over Again" (J. Harris)
"S.M.T.A.M." (Andrew Gibbs)
"Walkin' Away" (Daryl Braithwaite, Andrew Gibbs)
"Lullaby" (Andrew Gibbs)
"Nobody's Side" (Benny Andersson, Björn Ulvaeus, Tim Rice)

Personnel
 David Campbell – acoustic guitars
 John Corniola – drums
 Geoffrey Wells – electric guitar
 Michael Caruana – keyboard bass
 Rex Fernandez – bass guitar
 Andrew Gibbs – acoustic guitar
 Scott Griffiths – keyboards
 Brett Kingman – electric guitar
 Scott Kingman – guitars, bass, percussion, programming, keyboards
 Cam McKenzie – bass guitar
 Adam Quaife – additional piano
 Kim Webster – string arrangement and recording
 Adoration on the Gospel Train - vocal group (Janine Maunder, Michelle Serret, Troy McMillin, Annette Roche)

References

2005 albums
Daryl Braithwaite albums
Self-released albums